The 2016 Piala Tun Sharifah Rodziah is the 29th edition of Piala Tun Sharifah Rodziah a women's football tournament organised by Football Association of Malaysia. Kedah was the host and it took place in the Universiti Utara Malaysia, Sintok, Kedah. MISC-MIFA defeated Sabah in the final to retain their Piala Tun Sharifah Rodziah title after won the title for the first time in 2015.

The tournament offers prize money of RM20,000, a trophy and 25 gold medals to the winner, while the runner-up RM 10,000 and 25 silver medals and third place RM 5,000 and 25 bronze.

Teams
The draw for the group stage was held on 5 April 2017 at the Dewan Budi Siswa, Pusat Budaya dan Seni, Universiti Utara Malaysia. 12 teams participated in this edition where the teams were divided into two groups. The winners and runners-up advance to the semifinals.

Venue
Universiti Utara Malaysia, Sintok, Kedah
 Padang 1
 Padang 2
 Padang 3

Fixtures and results

Group stage

Group A

Group B

Knockout stage

Third place

Final

Champions

Goalscorers

References

External links
 Official website

Football cup competitions in Malaysia
Women's football in Malaysia